Tom W. Chick (born August 14, 1966) is an American actor and independent journalist. His most prominent TV roles were as Oscar's boyfriend Gil in the U.S. version of The Office, and the hard-hitting reporter Gordon in The West Wing.

Early life and education
Chick attended Harvard Divinity School and received a Master of Theological Studies with a focus on the Old Testament.

Career 
Deciding not to pursue the ministry, he later moved to Hollywood, California, where he pursued a career in writing about video games and occasionally acting for television roles. He is also the co-founder and administrator of a web-based site for games discussion, Quarter to Three.

Chick is an independent journalist whose columns on video games have appeared online and in print. As a freelance columnist, he has written for a number of sites, including Firing Squad, Yahoo Games, GameSpy, GameSpot, Xtreme Gamer, 1Up, Rotten Tomatoes and others. His articles have also appeared in magazines such as the "Tom vs. Bruce" series in Computer Gaming World, and he was listed as "one of the field's rare American practitioners" in an article on "New Games Journalism" in The New York Times.

In May 2008, he partnered with the Syfy as editor-in-chief of a new co-branded gaming blog, entitled Fidgit.

Chick's most successful television acting engagement was a recurring role as reporter Gordon in nine episodes of The West Wing. He also played Oscar's homosexual lover Gil in The Office, and Mario in The Nine.

Personal life 
In late September 2014, Chick revealed in a podcast that he had stage four Hypopharyngeal cancer and was about to begin chemotherapy.

Filmography

Film

Television

References

External links

Quarter to Three – Home Page
Shoot Club and other columns
60 second reviews
Fidgit Gaming Blog
Tom vs Bruce
Tom Chick's Quarter to Three Reviews on Metacritic

1966 births
Living people
21st-century American non-fiction writers
American bloggers
American columnists
American critics
American male bloggers
American male television actors
American male film actors
Video game critics
Harvard Divinity School alumni